Taminda is an industrial suburb of Tamworth, New South Wales, Australia, in the west of the city. It is mostly zoned industrial and consequently its residential population is very low. The northern part of Taminda is flood plains and is used as sporting fields. Floods in 1998 caused much damage in Taminda with rising waters that flowed into businesses. As a result, commencement in 2006 began on building levy banks separating many of the riverside sporting fields and the Peel River from the rest of Taminda where businesses are located to protect property from future floods.

Suburbs of Tamworth, New South Wales